The 2022 Chicago Sky season was the franchise's 17th season in the Women's National Basketball Association, and their fourth season under head coach James Wade. They were the defending league champions after defeating the Phoenix Mercury in the 2021 WNBA Finals.

Entering the offseason, the Sky only had four players from the previous season under contract. The team re-signed Courtney Vandersloot, Allie Quigley, and Kahleah Copper and added Emma Meesseman via free agency. Free agent Stefanie Dolson departed the team and signed with the New York Liberty. In a sign-and-trade deal, free agent Diamond DeShields was traded to the Phoenix Mercury and the Sky added Julie Allemand.

The defending champions lost the first game of the season, in overtime.  However, they recovered and won their next two games.  They finished the month winning three of five and with a 5–3 overall record.  The Sky started June strongly, winning five of their first six, before losing to Indiana, on June 19.  On June 21, the Sky broke the record for largest comeback win in WNBA history in a 104–95 win over the Las Vegas Aces after being down by 28 points. They used that momentum to win their next three games and finish the month with a 9–2 record.  In July the team kept the hot streak going, winning six games in a row from July 7 to July 22.  Four players were named to the All-Star Game: Candace Parker, Vandersloot, Copper, and Meesseman. They hosted the Commissioner's Cup, but lost to the Aces. The finished the month 9–2 and secured a playoff berth on July 20.  After having secured the berth, their momentum slowed and they finished August with a 3–3 record.  Their overall record of 26–10 was a franchise-best.  They ended as the second seed in the playoffs.

As the second seed in the playoffs, they hosted a First Round series against the New York Liberty.  They lost Game One of the series at home 91–98.  They followed that up with a dominant 38 point win at home in Game Two.  They Sky had to travel to New York for Game Three, and won by eighteen points to advance to the Semifinals.  There, they faced off against the third seed Connecticut Sun.  As the higher seed, they again had home court advantage in the series.  As in the First Round, they lost the first game at home.  The Sky followed that up with a home win and a road win.  They lost Game Four on the road by 24-points and could not finish the series at home in Game Five, losing 63–72 to end their season.

Transactions

WNBA Draft 
The Sky do not have any picks in the 2022 WNBA Draft, having traded their second- and third-round picks to the Dallas Wings and their first round pick to the Indiana Fever.

Trades and Roster Changes

Roster

Depth

Schedule

Preseason

|- style="background:#fcc;"
| 1
| April 25
| Dallas
| L 77–92
| Emma Meesseman (24)
| MaleyMeesseman (5)
| Dana Evans (7)
| Wintrust ArenaN/A
| 0–1
|- style="background:#fcc;"
| 2
| April 30
| @ Indiana
| L 75–79
| Emma Meesseman (13)
| Emma Meesseman (8)
| Evans/Taylor (3)
| Gainbridge FieldhouseN/A
| 0–2

Regular Season

|- style="background:#fcc;"
| 1
| May 6
| Los Angeles
| L 91–98 OT
| Dana Evans (24)
| Emma Meesseman (8)
| Courtney Vandersloot (8)
| Wintrust Arena8,111
| 0–1
|- style="background:#cfc;"
| 2
| May 11
| New York
| W 83–50
| Dana Evans (15)
| MeessemanVandersloot (6)
| Courtney Vandersloot (6)
| Wintrust Arena4,935
| 1–1
|- style="background:#cfc;"
| 3
| May 14
| @ Minnesota
| W 82–78
| Emma Meesseman (17)
| Emma Meesseman (7)
| Courtney Vandersloot (11)
| Target Center6,503
| 2–1
|- style="background:#fcc;"
| 4
| May 18
| @ Seattle
| L 71–74
| Azurá Stevens (18)
| Candace Parker (9)
| Courtney Vandersloot (12)
| Climate Pledge Arena7,450
| 2–2
|- style="background:#cfc;"
| 5
| May 22
| @ Washington
| W 82–73
| Candace Parker (16)
| Candace Parker (13)
| Candace Parker (10)
| Entertainment and Sports Arena4,200
| 3–2
|- style="background:#cfc;"
| 6
| May 24
| Indiana
| W 95–90
| Candace Parker (16)
| Azurá Stevens (7)
| ParkerVandersloot (7)
| Wintrust Arena7,741
| 4–2
|- style="background:#fcc;"
| 7
| May 28
| Las Vegas
| L 76–83
| CopperVandersloot (12)
| Candace Parker (11)
| ParkerVandersloot (3)
| Wintrust Arena6,812
| 4–3
|- style="background:#cfc;"
| 8
| May 31
| Phoenix
| W 73–70
| Courtney Vandersloot (18)
| Candace Parker (11)
| Courtney Vandersloot (6)
| Wintrust Arena5,133
| 5–3

|- style="background:#cfc;"
| 9
| June 3
| @ Atlanta
| W 73–65
| Kahleah Copper (21)
| Kahleah Copper (8)
| Courtney Vandersloot (6)
| Gateway Center Arena3,138
| 6–3
|- style="background:#cfc;"
| 10
| June 5
| Washington
| W 91–82
| Kahleah Copper (15)
| Candace Parker (13)
| MeessemanParkerVandersloot (6)
| Wintrust Arena6,228
| 7–3
|- style="background:#fcc;"
| 11
| June 8
| @ Washington
| L 82–84
| Candace Parker (16)
| Candace Parker (9)
| Courtney Vandersloot (5)
| Entertainment and Sports Arena2,984
| 7–4
|- style="background:#cfc;"
| 12
| June 10
| @ Connecticut
| W 83–79
| Emma Meesseman (26)
| Kahleah CopperGardnerMeesseman (5)
| Courtney Vandersloot (8)
| Mohegan Sun Arena4,816
| 8–4
|- style="background:#cfc;"
| 13
| June 12
| @ New York
| W 88–86
| MeessemanVandersloot (20)
| Emma Meesseman (11)
| Courtney Vandersloot (10)
| Barclays Center4,810
| 9–4
|- style="background:#cfc;"
| 14
| June 17
| Atlanta
| W 106–100 (OT)
| Kahleah Copper (23)
| Emma Meesseman (12)
| AllemandGardner (5)
| Wintrust Arena7,435
| 10–4
|- style="background:#fcc;"
| 15
| June 19
| @ Indiana
| L 87–89
| Kahleah Copper (28)
| Emma Meesseman (8)
| Courtney Vandersloot (7)
| Indiana Farmers Coliseum1,706
| 10–5
|- style="background:#cfc;"
| 16
| June 21
| @ Las Vegas
| W 104–95
| Courtney Vandersloot (25)
| Candace Parker (10)
| Courtney Vandersloot (8)
| Michelob Ultra Arena4,951
| 11–5
|- style="background:#cfc;"
| 17
| June 23
| @ Los Angeles
| W 82–59
| StevensVandersloot (15)
| Candace Parker (14)
| Candace Parker (10)
| Crypto.com Arena5,627
| 12–5
|- style="background:#cfc;"
| 18
| June 26
| Minnesota
| W 88–85
| Courtney Vandersloot (18)
| Candace Parker (8)
| Allie Quigley (8)
| Wintrust Arena7,022
| 13–5
|- style="background:#cfc;"
| 19
| June 29
| Connecticut
| W 91–83
| Candace Parker (25)
| Candace Parker (11)
| Candace Parker (7)
| Wintrust Arena6,709
| 14–5

|- style="background:#cfc;"
| 20
| July 2
| Phoenix
| W 91–75
| Allie Quigley (19)
| Candace Parker (8)
| Candace Parker (7)
| Wintrust Arena8,028
| 15–5
|- style="background:#fcc;"
| 21
| July 6
| @ Minnesota
| L 78–81
| Kahleah Copper (20)
| Candace Parker (10)
| Candace Parker (6)
| Target Center11,103
| 15–6
|- style="background:#cfc;"
| 22
| July 7
| @ Indiana
| W 93–84
| Emma Meesseman (20)
| Candace Parker (9)
| Courtney Vandersloot (6)
| Indiana Farmers Coliseum1,839
| 16–6
|- style="background:#cfc;"
| 23
| July 12
| Atlanta
| W 90–75
| Candace Parker (31)
| Candace Parker (11)
| Emma Meesseman (8)
| Wintrust Arena7,074
| 17–6
|- style="background:#cfc;"
| 24
| July 14
| @ Los Angeles
| W 80–68
| Rebekah Gardner (18)
| Candace Parker (11)
| AllemandGardnerCa. ParkerVandersloot (4)
| Crypto.com Arena5,856
| 18–6
|- style="background:#cfc;"
| 25
| July 16
| @ Dallas
| W 89–81
| CopperMeesseman (23)
| Kahleah Copper (14)
| Julie Allemand (8)
| College Park Center5,126
| 19–6
|- style="background:#cfc;"
| 26
| July 20
| Seattle
| W 78–74
| Allie Quigley (18)
| Emma Meesseman (10)
| Emma Meesseman (6)
| Wintrust Arena8,893
| 20–6
|- style="background:#cfc;"
| 27
| July 22
| Dallas
| W 89–83
| Kahleah Copper (19)
| Candace Parker (10)
| Emma Meesseman (9)
| Wintrust Arena7,014
| 21–6
|- style="background:#fcc;"
| 28
| July 23
| @ New York
| L 80–83
| Candace Parker (21)
| Candace Parker (11)
| GardnerCa. Parker (3)
| Barclays Center6,926
| 21–7
|-
| CC Final
| July 26
| Las Vegas
| L 83–93
| Candace Parker (20)
| Candace Parker (14)
| Julie Allemand (6)
| Wintrust Arena8,922
| N/A
|- style="background:#cfc;"
| 29
| July 29
| New York
| W 89–81
| Courtney Vandersloot (23)
| Kahleah Copper (11)
| Courtney Vandersloot (9)
| Wintrust Arena6,924
| 22–7
|- style="background:#cfc;"
| 30
| July 31
| @ Connecticut
| W 95–92 (OT)
| Kahleah Copper (27)
| Azurá Stevens (10)
| Courtney Vandersloot (12)
| Mohegan Sun Arena6,254
| 23–7
|-

|- style="background:#fcc;"
| 31
| August 2
| Dallas
| L 78–84
| Kahleah Copper (19)
| Kahleah Copper (11)
| Courtney Vandersloot (8)
| Wintrust Arena5,602
| 23–8
|- style="background:#cfc;"
| 32
| August 5
| Washington
| W 93–83
| Kahleah Copper (19)
| Azurá Stevens (6)
| Courtney Vandersloot (7)
| Wintrust Arena8,042
| 24–8
|- style="background:#cfc;"
| 33
| August 7
| Connecticut
| W 94–91
| Courtney Vandersloot (20)
| Candace Parker (12)
| MeessemanCa. ParkerVandersloot (5)
| Wintrust Arena8,224
| 25–8
|- style="background:#fcc;"
| 34
| August 9
| Seattle
| L 100–111
| Courtney Vandersloot (28)
| Candace Parker (7)
| Courtney Vandersloot (7)
| Wintrust Arena9,314
| 25–9
|- style="background:#fcc;"
| 35
| August 11
| @ Las Vegas
| L 78–89
| Kahleah Copper (28)
| Candace Parker (12)
| Ca. ParkerVandersloot (6)
| Michelob Ultra Arena6,055
| 25–10
|- style="background:#cfc;"
| 36
| August 14
| @ Phoenix
| W 82–67
| Azurá Stevens (17)
| Candace Parker (6)
| Julie Allemand (6)
| Footprint Center12,383
| 26–10
|-

Playoffs 

|- style="background:#fcc;"
| 1
| August 17
| New York
| L 91–98
| Kahleah Copper (21)
| Candace Parker (10)
| Courtney Vandersloot (10)
| Wintrust Arena7,524
| 0–1
|- style="background:#cfc;"
| 2
| August 20
| New York
| W 100–62
| Kahleah Copper (20)
| Candace Parker (12)
| Allie Quigley (8)
| Wintrust Arena7,732
| 1–1
|- style="background:#cfc;"
| 3
| August 23
| @ New York
| W 90–72
| CopperQuigley (15)
| Candace Parker (13)
| Courtney Vandersloot (10)
| Barclays Center7,837
| 2–1

|- style="background:#fcc;"
| 1
| August 28
| Connecticut
| L 63–68
| Candace Parker (19)
| Candace Parker (18)
| Emma Meesseman (7)
| Wintrust Arena8,955
| 0–1
|- style="background:#cfc;"
| 2
| August 31
| Connecticut
| W 85–77
| Candace Parker (22)
| Emma Meesseman (7)
| Courtney Vandersloot (8)
| Wintrust Arena8,311
| 1–1
|- style="background:#cfc;"
| 3
| September 4
| @ Connecticut
| W 76–72
| Candace Parker (16)
| Candace Parker (11)
| Emma Meesseman (6)
| Mohegan Sun Arena9,142
| 2–1
|- style="background:#fcc;"
| 4
| September 6
| @ Connecticut
| L 80–104
| Kahleah Copper (16)
| Candace Parker (9)
| Emma Meesseman (6)
| Mohegan Sun Arena5,868
| 2–2
|- style="background:#fcc;"
| 5
| September 8
| Connecticut
| L 63–72
| Kahleah Copper (22)
| Candace Parker (9)
| Allie Quigley (7)
| Wintrust Arena8,014
| 2–3

Standings

Playoffs

Statistics

Regular Season 

‡Waived/Released during the season
†Traded during the season
≠Acquired during the season

Playoffs

Awards and Honors

References

External links 

 Official website of the Chicago Sky

Chicago Sky
Chicago Sky seasons
Chicago Sky